Dilys is a feminine given name of Welsh origin, which translates into English as genuine, steadfast, valid, true  or perfect.
The name may refer to:

People
 Dilys Breese (1932–2007), British television producer
 Dilys Cadwaladr (1902–1979), Welsh poet
 Dilys Craven (1919–2008), Australian pediatrician
 Dilys Grace Edmunds (1879–1926), Welsh teacher in India
 Dilys Elwyn-Edwards (1918–2012), Welsh musician
 Dilys Hamlett (1928–2002), English actress
 Dilys Laing (1906–1960), American poet
 Dilys Laye (1934–2009), English actress and screenwriter
 Dilys Powell (1901–1995), British journalist and writer
 Dilys Price (1932–2020), Welsh educator, parachutist, and model
 Dilys Rose (born 1954), Scottish poet and writer
 Dilys Watling (1943–2021), English actress
 Dilys Winn (1939–2016), American bookseller

Fictional characters
 Professor Dilys Derwent, a witch, healer and ex-headmistress of Hogwarts in the Harry Potter book and film series
 Dilys Price, in the animated TV series Fireman Sam

See also
 Dilys Breese Medal, awarded by the British Trust for Ornithology, and named after Dilys Breese

Welsh feminine given names
Feminine given names
Given names
Virtue names